Yasemin Can (born Vivian Jemutai on December 11, 1996) is a Kenyan female long distance runner representing Turkey who specialises in the 5000 metres and 10,000 metres. She is the reigning 10,000 m European champion. Can is a six-time European Championship medallist, including three gold medals and the 5000 m/10,000 m double in 2016, and a four-time European Cross Country champion.

She competed for Kenya before 13 March 2016, when she officially became eligible to represent Turkey at international competitions. Can is the Turkish record holder for the half marathon, and the Turkish indoor record holder for the 3000 m and 5000 m. She is a two-time Turkish champion.

Career
Can earned a quota spot for the women's 5000 m event in the 2016 Rio Olympics running 15:08.46 at the Turkish Indoor Championships in Istanbul. She secured another quota spot for 10,000 m event running 31:30.58 at the Turkish Championships in Mersin. She set a new European under-23 record with her time.

She took part at the Golden Gala leg of 2016 IAAF Diamond League in Rome, Italy, and placing sixth in the 5000 m in a time of 14:37.61.

Can won the gold medal in the women's 10,000 m at the 2016 European Athletics Championships in Amsterdam, Netherlands. Her time of 31:12.86 improved her own European U23 record by 18 seconds. She won her second gold medal in the 5000 m at the same championship.

At the 2016 Rio Olympics, she was a finalist in the fastest 10,000 m race in the history, placing seventh with a personal best time of 30:26.41.

On 5 March 2017, Can won a silver medal in the 3000 m at the 2017 European Athletics Indoor Championships in Belgrade behind Laura Muir.

Can won gold medals in the women's 10,000 m and 5000 m at the 2017 European Athletics U23 Championships in Bydgoszcz, Poland.

In 2020, she competed in the women's half marathon at the 2020 World Athletics Half Marathon Championships held in Gdynia, Poland.

On 15 August 2022, Can won the gold medal and regained her European 10,000 m title at Munich 2022, finishing in a time of 30:32.57. She placed second in the 5000 m behind Konstanze Klosterhalfen and ahead of Eilish McColgan three days later.

Achievements

International competitions

1Did not finish in the final

Personal bests
 3000 metres indoor – 8:43.46 (Belgrade 2017) 
 5000 metres – 14:36.82 (Rome 2017)
 5000 metres indoor – 15:08.46 (Istanbul 2016) 
 10,000 metres – 30:26.41 (Rio de Janeiro 2016)
Road
 5 km – 15:23 (Herzogenaurach 2021) 
 10 km – 32:01 (Chon Buri 2020)
 Half marathon – 1:06:20 (Gdynia 2020)

National titles
 Turkish Athletics Championships
 10,000 metres: 2016
 Turkish Indoor Athletics Championships
 5000 metres: 2016

References

External links

 

Living people
1996 births
Kenyan female long-distance runners
Kenyan female cross country runners
Turkish female long-distance runners
Turkish mountain runners
Naturalized citizens of Turkey
Kenyan emigrants to Turkey
Enkaspor athletes
Olympic athletes of Turkey
Athletes (track and field) at the 2016 Summer Olympics
Universiade medalists in athletics (track and field)
European Cross Country Championships winners
European Athletics Championships winners
European champions for Turkey
Competitors at the 2018 Mediterranean Games
Universiade bronze medalists for Turkey
Turkish female cross country runners
Medalists at the 2015 Summer Universiade
Mediterranean Games competitors for Turkey
Athletes (track and field) at the 2020 Summer Olympics
Olympic female long-distance runners
Mediterranean Games gold medalists in athletics
Athletes (track and field) at the 2022 Mediterranean Games
Mediterranean Games gold medalists for Turkey
Competitors at the 2022 Mediterranean Games
Islamic Solidarity Games medalists in athletics